The Educational Global Climate Model or EdGCM is a fully functional global climate model (GCM) that has been ported for use on desktop computers (Windows PCs and Macs). It operates through a graphical user interface and is integrated with a relational database and scientific visualization utilities, all of which aim at helping improve the quality of teaching and understanding of climatology by making real-world research experiences more accessible. EdGCM is designed to permit teachers and students to conduct in-depth investigations of past, present and future climate scenarios in a manner that is essentially identical to the techniques used by national and international climate research organizations.

 

EdGCM was developed at the Goddard Institute for Space Studies as a joint project of Columbia University and NASA scientists and programmers. The Global Climate Model at the core of EdGCM is GISS Model II. During the 1980s and early 1990s this GCM was one of NASA's primary climate research tools. Results from the model have appeared in hundreds of scientific publications.

The coarser resolution of the climate model in EdGCM (8° x 10°, latitude x longitude) makes it inexpensive to run. But, because it contains most of the key atmospheric physics of modern GCMs, EdGCM is also used by climate researchers who do not have access to the most recent GCM versions.

See also
 NASA Goddard Institute for Space Studies
 NCAR Community Climate System Model
 NOAA GFDL CM2.X
 Earth Simulator
 HadCM3 - explanation of an AOGCM

External links 
 EdGCM at Columbia University

 

Numerical climate and weather models
Meteorology and climate education
NASA spin-off technologies